Rebecca McKenna (born 13 April 2001) is a Northern Irish footballer who plays as a defender and has appeared for Lewes in the FA Women's Championship and the Northern Ireland women's national team.

Career
McKenna has been capped for the Northern Ireland national team, appearing for the team during the 2019 FIFA Women's World Cup qualifying cycle.

On 6 July 2021 McKenna joined FA Women's Championship team Lewes.

International goals

References

External links
 
 
 
 Profile at Lewes W.F.C.

2001 births
Living people
Women's association footballers from Northern Ireland
Northern Ireland women's international footballers
Women's association football forwards
Linfield Ladies F.C. players
Women's Premiership (Northern Ireland) players
Lewes F.C. Women players
Women's Championship (England) players
UEFA Women's Euro 2022 players